The First Circle is a 1973 English-language drama film directed by Aleksander Ford and starring Gunther Malzacher. It is an adaptation of the novel In the First Circle by Aleksandr Solzhenitsyn. The film was a co-production between Danish and West German companies.

Cast
 Gunther Malzacher as Gleb Nerzhin
 Elżbieta Czyżewska as Simochka
 Peter Steen as Volodin
 Vera Tschechowa as Clara
 Ole Ernst as Ruska Doronin
 Ingolf David as Rubin
 Preben Neergaard as Bobynin
 Preben Lerdorff Rye as professor Chelnov
 Per Bentzon Goldschmidt as Bulatov
 Ole Ishøy as Siromakha

References

External links
 

1973 drama films
1973 films
Danish drama films
English-language German films
Films about miscarriage of justice
Films based on Russian novels
Films based on works by Aleksandr Solzhenitsyn
Films critical of communism
Films directed by Aleksander Ford
Films set in the Soviet Union
German drama films
1970s prison drama films
West German films
1970s English-language films
1970s German films